Lexical Variant Generation (lvg) is a suite of CLI tools that are used to perform lexical transformations to text. The goal is to generate lexical variants in Natural language processing of patient clinical documents.

See also
 Lexical semantics
 Unified Medical Language System

References

External links

 https://lexsrv3.nlm.nih.gov/LexSysGroup/Projects/lvg/2014/docs/userDoc/tools/lvg.html
 https://www.nlm.nih.gov/research/umls/new_users/online_learning/LEX_004.html

Natural language processing software